Acaulospora appendicula is a species of fungus in the family Acaulosporaceae. It forms arbuscular mycorrhiza and vesicles in roots. Found in Colombia, the species was described as new to science in 1984.

References

Diversisporales
Fungi of Colombia
Fungi described in 1984